was a state which was located in and around modern-day Fukuoka City, on the Japanese island of Kyūshū, from the 1st to early 3rd centuries. Much of what is known about it comes from ancient records of both China and Japan.

According to the Book of the Later Han, in 57 CE, Emperor Guangwu of Han granted Nakoku an imperial seal, patterned after the Chinese jade seals, but made of gold: the king of Na gold seal.
In return, that same year, Na sent envoys to the Chinese capital, offering tribute and formal New Year's greetings. This seal was discovered over 1500 years later, by an Edo period farmer on Shikanoshima Island, thus helping to verify the existence of Nakoku, which was otherwise known only from the ancient chronicles. Engraved upon it are the Chinese characters  (Kan no Wa no Na-no-Koku-ō, "King of the Na state of the Wa (vassal) of Han". 

A reference is found in vol. 30 of the Chinese Book of Wei from the Records of the Three Kingdoms,  titled "The Account of the Easterners: A Note on the Wa", to the continued existence of Nakoku in the 3rd century, naming the officials and stating that it contains over 20,000 homes.

Some believe that Nakoku may also correspond to Na-no-Agata, a principality which preceded Fukuoka City.

See also
 Na and Wa (倭)
 names of Japan

Notes and references

Much of the content of this article is derived from that on the corresponding article on the Japanese Wikipedia. Transcriptions of the relevant portions from the ancient texts can be found there as well.
Frederic, Louis. "Nakoku." Japan Encyclopedia. Cambridge: Harvard University Press, 2002.

Former countries in Japanese history
Yayoi period
States of the Wajinden
Wajinden